The Kivu shrew (Crocidura kivuana) is a species of mammal in the family Soricidae. It is endemic to Democratic Republic of the Congo.  Its natural habitat is swamp.

Sources
 Hutterer, R. 2004.  Crocidura kivuana.   2006 IUCN Red List of Threatened Species.   Downloaded on 30 July 2007.

Kivu shrew
Endemic fauna of the Democratic Republic of the Congo
Kivu shrew
Taxonomy articles created by Polbot
Taxa named by Henri Heim de Balsac